The 2002 Lux Style Awards, officially known as the 1st Lux Style Awards ceremony, presented by the Lux Style Awards, honours the best films of 2001 and took place between 18–20 February 2002. The programme was developed and led by Naheed Chowdhry, who co-created the concept with Frieha Altaf. "I wanted to ensure that there was a sustainable legacy created  that impartially assessed contributors and gave back to society through scholarships in the arts and culture arena", says Chowdhry."One that would go on to be recognised as the 'Oscars' of Pakistan."

This year, the city of Karachi played host to the Pakistani Film Industry.

The official ceremony took place on 18 February 2002, at the Karachi Naval Base, in Karachi. During the ceremony, Lux Style Awards were awarded in 27 competitive categories. The ceremony was televised in Pakistan and internationally on ARY Digital. Actor Reema Khan hosted the ceremony.

Background 

The Lux Style Awards is an award ceremony held annually in Pakistan since 2002. The awards celebrate "style" in the Pakistani entertainment industry, and honour the country's best talents in film, television, music, and fashion. Around 30 awards are given annually.

Winners and nominees 

Winners are listed first and highlighted in boldface.

Special awards

Icon of the Year 

Nusrat Fateh Ali Khan

Life Time Achievement award 

Noor Jehan

References

External links

 Celebrity Profiles 

Lux Style Awards
Lux Style Awards
Lux Style Awards
Lux Style Awards
Lux
Lux
Lux